The 2015–16 National Youth League (Also known as the Foxtel National Youth League for sponsorship reasons) was the eighth season of the Australian National Youth League competition. The season ran in a different, reduced format to previous years, and in parallel with the 2015–16 A-League season.

Teams

Format
This season was run with a new format.  From 2016, all A-League clubs now have youth teams entered into their local conferences of the National Premier Leagues.  By having NPL teams, there is now less reliance on the NYL to provide an avenue for youth players to their respective clubs. There was also pressure from A-League clubs to reduce travel budgets.  As such the season was shortened from 18 games per team to 8 games plus a Grand Final.  The existing ten NYL teams were divided into two conferences of five teams: Conference A consisted of teams from WA, SA, Victoria and Queensland, while teams from ACT and NSW were in Conference B.  All teams played all other teams in their conference on a home and away basis. After the home and away series a Grand Final was played between the top teams from each conference.

Standings

Results

Positions by round

Group stage

Conference A
Round 1

Round 2

Round 3

Round 4

Round 5

Round 6

Round 7

Round 8

Round 9

Round 10

Conference B
Round 1

Round 2

Round 3

Round 4

Round 5

Round 6

Round 7

Round 8

Round 9

Round 10

Grand final

References

External links
Official National Youth League website

2015–16 A-League season
A-League National Youth League seasons